Aréna Sopron (official sponsored name Novomatic Musical Aréna Sopron, previously MKB Aréna) is a multi-purpose indoor arena in Sopron, Hungary. Its best known tenant is the women's basketball club UNIQA Sopron, one of the top teams of the Hungarian championship. They also play in the EuroLeague Women where they have reached the Final Four in 2009. The arena hosts other indoor sports as well as cultural events, exhibitions, shows and musicals. In addition, it features a hotel, a restaurant and a fitness center.

In 2005, the managing company of Uniqua Euroleasing Sopron, Raabersport Kft. acquired the operating rights of the arena, and completely renovated it.

Events
 Ligno Novum Wood Tech Expo
 2006 FIBA Europe Women's Under-20 European Championship
 2015 FIBA Europe Women's European Championship

References

External links
 

Sport in Sopron
Indoor arenas in Hungary
Basketball venues in Hungary
Music venues in Hungary
Buildings and structures in Győr-Moson-Sopron County